Hylocereus is a former genus of epiphytic cacti, often referred to as night-blooming cactus (though the term is also used for many other cacti). Several species previously placed in the genus have large edible fruits, which are known as pitayas, pitahayas or dragonfruits. In 2017, a molecular phylogenetic study confirmed an earlier finding that the genus Hylocereus was nested within Selenicereus, so all the species of Hylocereus were transferred to Selenicereus.

Description
The species previously placed in the genus Hylocereus grow hanging, climbing or epiphytic. They are freely branched, shrubby plants that form aerial roots and become very large with a height of 10 m or more. The green, often glaucous shoots are usually terete or triangular.

Taxonomy
In the 1994 classification of the International Cactaceae Systematics Group of the International Organization for Succulent Plant Study, the genus Hylocereus was one of the six genera of the tribe Hylocereeae. A 2011 study of the molecular phylogeny of the Cactaceae concluded that neither the tribe nor the genus was monophyletic (i.e. neither comprised all the descendants of a common ancestor). Two species of Hylocereus formed a clade with two species of Selenicereus, suggesting that the genera were not distinct. This result was confirmed in a larger study in 2017, and all the species of Hylocereus were transferred to Selenicereus.

Species
Species that were placed in the genus in 2012 that are now placed in Selenicereus include the following.
Hylocereus calcaratus  → Selenicereus calcaratus
Hylocereus costaricensis  → Selenicereus costaricensis
Hylocereus escuintlensis  → Selenicereus escuintlensis
Hylocereus megalanthus  → Selenicereus megalanthus
Hylocereus monacanthus  → Selenicereus monacanthus
Hylocereus minutiflorus  → Selenicereus minutiflorus
Hylocereus ocamponis  → Selenicereus ocamponis
Hylocereus setaceus   → Selenicereus setaceus
Hylocereus stenopterus  → Selenicereus stenopterus
Hylocereus triangularis  → Selenicereus triangularis
Hylocereus trigonus  → Selenicereus trigonus 
Hylocereus undatus  → Selenicereus undatus

See also
Epiphyllum – another cactus genus yielding edible fruits

References

CactiGuide: Hylocereus
Cactuspedia.info:  Hylocereus undatus

Historically recognized angiosperm genera
Cacti of North America
Night-blooming plants